Robert Burns Mantle (December 23, 1873February 9, 1948) was an American theater critic.  He founded the Best Plays annual publication in 1920.

Biography
Mantle was born in Watertown, New York, on December 23, 1873, to Robert Burns Mantle and Susan Lawrence.  As a child he moved to Denver, Colorado.

By 1892, he was working as a linotype machine operator in California and then became a reporter.

By the late 1890s, Mantle was working as a drama critic for the Denver Times.  He later moved to Chicago, Illinois, and then New York City, New York, in 1911.  He was at the New York Evening Mail until 1922, and then the Daily News until his retirement in 1943.  Mantle was succeeded as the drama critic at the Daily News by his assistant John Arthur Chapman.

He died, aged 74, of stomach cancer on February 9, 1948.

His wife was the former Lydia (Lillie) Sears; her sister Clara Sears Taylor was a journalist and government official who assisted Mantle with compiling his Best Plays publications.

References

External links
 
 
 
The Best Plays Theater Yearbook - Page on Mantle

1873 births
1949 deaths
19th-century American journalists
19th-century American male writers
19th-century American newspaper people
American male journalists
American theater critics
Deaths from stomach cancer
Journalists from California
Journalists from Illinois
New York Daily News people
People from Watertown, New York
Special Tony Award recipients
Writers from California
Writers from Chicago
Writers from Denver
Writers from New York City